Kamenianoi is a mountain village and a community in the municipal unit of Aroania, Achaea, Greece. In 2011 the population was 85 for the village, and 116 for the community, which includes the village Drovolovo. It is situated in the eastern foothills of Mount Erymanthos. Kamenianoi is 2 km west of Desino, 4 km southeast of Lechouri and 17 km southwest of Kalavryta.

Population

History

The name comes from the multitude of furnaces that existed here in the past. According to a myth, Hercules caught the Erymanthian Boar in the area called Kaprivaina.

See also
List of settlements in Achaea

References

External links
Kamenianoi at the GTP Travel Pages

Aroania
Populated places in Achaea